Chrysochromulina elegans is a species of haptophytes. It is found in Baltic Sea in Europe  and in Brazil in South America.

References

External links 
 Chrysochromulina elegans at AlgaeBase

Haptophyte species
Species described in 1984